isai VL LGV31 is an Android smartphone developed by LG Electronics for the Japanese market with the carrier au.  It launched 12 December 2014 as a successor to the isai FL LGL24.

au announced on 4 June 2015 that the LGV31 was one of ten au models planned to receive an upgrade to Android 5.0.

References

Works cited

External links

 
 
 

Android (operating system) devices
LG Electronics mobile phones
Mobile phones introduced in 2014